Cortinarius neotropicus is a fungus native to Costa Rica. It was described in 2015 by Emma Harrower and colleagues, and is closely related to the northern hemisphere species Cortinarius violaceus.

See also
List of Cortinarius species

References

External links

neotropicus
Fungi described in 2015
Fungi of Central America